Cryobacterium psychrophilum is the type species of the bacterial genus Cryobacterium. It is an obligately psychrophilic, Gram-positive irregular rod-shaped actinomycete.

References

Further reading
Whitman, William B., et al., eds. Bergey's manual® of systematic bacteriology. Vol. 5. Springer, 2012.

External links

LPSN
Type strain of Cryobacterium psychrophilum at BacDive -  the Bacterial Diversity Metadatabase

Microbacteriaceae
Bacteria described in 1997
Psychrophiles